The Journal of Engineering Mechanics  is a peer-reviewed scientific journal published by the American Society of Civil Engineers, and covers activity and development in the field of applied mechanics as it relates to civil engineering. Published papers typically describe the development and implementation of new analytical models, innovative numerical methods, and novel experimental methods and results.

Indexes
The journal is indexed in Google Scholar, Baidu, Elsevier (Ei Compendex), Clarivate Analytics (Web of Science), ProQuest, Civil engineering database, TRDI, OCLC (WorldCat), IET/INSPEC, Crossref, Scopus, and EBSCOHost.

References

External links

 ASCE Library

Civil engineering journals
American Society of Civil Engineers academic journals
Publications established in 1875